The muiñeira (Galician: muiñeira, Castilian: muñeira) is a traditional dance and musical genre of Galicia (Spain). There are also variant types of muiñeira which remain in the tempo of  but which displace the accent in different ways. Muiñeira is associated with traditional choreographic schemes and the associated instrumentation is a form of bagpipe known as a gaita. It is subject to highly varied interpretation in differing local traditions. The word "muiñeira" (the same pronunciation in Portuguese, but spelled "moinheira") means literally both millstone and a mill landlady (or the miller's wife, if a man). Galician music is classified as part of Celtic music.

Characteristics of the muiñeira
It is a dance of playful character, with a social component expressing gallantry. It is somewhat more permissive of improvisation than other folk dances; improvised in fiestas and exhibitions. Some interpreters  have added increased complexity to its traditional choreography.

It is played at a fast tempo. Dancers often form a circle or parallel threes. Often jumps are incorporated, synchronized with percussion accompaniment: a snare-drum known as the tamboril (a wooden natural-skinned drum with gut snares), and the bombo, a bass drum.

Examples of the genre recommended by native Spanish commentators include ' ' Muiñeira de Chantada' ' and to ' ' Muiñeira de Lugo' '.

Notable performers

Carlos Núñez
According to RootsWorld"the most prominent gaita virtuoso in Galicia, and one of the world's best, is Carlos Núñez. He often tours and records with The Chieftains, who consider him an auxiliary member of the group". Núñez performed a "Muneira de Chantada" with the Chieftains in early 2008, which featured Irish foot dancing.

Susana Seivane

Susana Seivane Hoyo (born 25 August 1976) is a Galician gaita (bagpipes) player born in Barcelona, Spain, into a family of well-known Galician luthiers and musicians, the Seivane family, whose workshop is the Obradoiro de Gaitas Seivane. She started her musical career at the age of three. Guided by her father Álvaro Seivane and influenced by skilled bagpipers such as her grandfather Xosé Manuel Seivane, Ricardo Portela and Moxenas, she is notable in the bagpipe world and the world of traditional Galician music. She synthesizes the "enxebre" style of the ancient bagpipers while creating her own style including other musical influences.

Instrumentation
Galician bagpipes come in three main varieties, though there are exceptions and unique instruments. These include the tumbal (B-flat), grileira (D) and redonda (C). Asturian bagpipes are usually played along with a tambor (snare drum). Asturian bagpipes usually have only one drone and follow a different fingering pattern. Tunes using the gaita are usually songs, with the voice either accompanying the instrumentation or taking turns with it.

See also
Music of Spain
Celtic music
Bagpipes

References

Additional references
Cronshaw, Andrew.  "Celtic Iberia". 2001.  In Mathieson, Kenny (Ed.), Celtic music, pp. 140–175.  Backbeat Books.  
Celtic Music Base, large biographical directory of Celtic musicians.

External links
 Video: " Muiñeira de Fraga", video in YouTube.
 Video: " Muiñeira de Chantada" interpreted with frauta, video in  * Video: " Ribeirana cantada", video in YouTube.
 Video: " Muiñeira de Poio" /" Muiñeira de Ourense", by Carlos Núñez and Liam O' Flynn
 Aniversario, Teatro Avenida

Music of Spain by autonomous community
Galician music
Cantabrian music
Asturian music
Folk music genres
Performing arts pages with videographic documentation
Spanish dances
Spanish folk music
Spanish music